Yield to the Night is a 1954 novel by the British writer Joan Henry. Henry had served a prison sentence in 1951 for passing fraudulent cheques and had written a bestselling book Who Lie in Gaol based on her experiences. She followed this up with Yield to the Night a fictional story about a woman sentenced to death for murder.

Film adaptation
In 1956 it was adapted into a film of the same title directed by J. Lee Thompson and starring Diana Dors, Yvonne Mitchell and Michael Craig.

References

Bibliography
 Chibnall, Steve. J. Lee Thompson. Manchester University Press,  2021.
 Goble, Alan. The Complete Index to Literary Sources in Film. Walter de Gruyter, 1999.
 Schwan, Anne. Convict Voices: Women, Class, and Writing about Prison in Nineteenth-Century England. University of New Hampshire Press, 2 Dec 2014.

1954 British novels
British novels adapted into films
Victor Gollancz Ltd books